Kia Tabatabaee (also Kia Tabatabai) (born on 3 December 1951 in Gorgan) is a senior Iranian diplomat and currently Director of Ravand Institute for Economic and International Studies.

Education
Kia Tabatabai  holds master's degree  from the University of Texas .

Career
During his 32 years of service in the Ministry of Foreign Affairs (Iran), he held following positions :
Ambassador to USSR (1982–1986)
Ambassador to United Nations Office at Geneva  (1990–1994)
Ambassador to Switzerland (1998–2002) 
Deputy secretary general of D-8 Organization for economic cooperation, Istanbul, Turkey (2006–2011)
Tabatabaee negotiated eight rounds of Trade talks with EU Trade Commission under Trade and Cooperation Agreement between Iran and EU.

He has participated at international conferences such as: World Economic Forum in Davus and Crans Montana Forum in Switzerland along with regional conferences such as ECO-G15, Indian-Ocean Rim Association.

Tabatabaee is also head of international affairs department in the charity foundation for special diseases.

References

1951 births
Living people
Iranian diplomats